Ángel David Rodríguez García (born 25 April 1980) is a Spanish sprinter. He specializes in the 100 metres. His personal best time is 10.23 seconds in the 100 metres, achieved in July 2008 in Salamanca, and 20.61 seconds in the 200 metres, achieved in July 2008 in Barcelona.

Rodríguez finished eighth in 100 m and 4 × 100 m relay at the 2002 World Cup. He also competed at the 2006 European Championships, the 2007 World Championships, the 2008 World Indoor Championships, the 2008 Olympic Games and the 2012 Olympic Games without reaching the final. In Beijing, he competed at the 100 metres sprint and placed 4th in his heat in a time of 10.34 seconds. Only the first three of each heat qualified, but his time was the third fastest losing time after Nobuharu Asahara's 10.25, advancing him to the next round. There he came to 10.35 but was eliminated after he finished in 8th place in his heat. He also took part in the 200 metres individual, finishing fourth with a time of 20.87 seconds in his first round heat. With 20.96 seconds in his second round he only placed eighth in his heat, which was not enough for the semi-finals.

In 2011, Rodríguez was featured in Castrol's Ronaldo: Tested to the Limit when he ran against Cristiano Ronaldo over a 25-metre straight sprint, in which he beat Ronaldo 0.30 seconds, and a 25-metre zig-zag course, in which Ronaldo beat him by 0.51 seconds.

Competition record

References

1980 births
Living people
Spanish male sprinters
Athletes (track and field) at the 2008 Summer Olympics
Athletes (track and field) at the 2012 Summer Olympics
Olympic athletes of Spain
Athletes (track and field) at the 2018 Mediterranean Games
Athletes from Madrid
Athletes (track and field) at the 2019 European Games
European Games competitors for Spain
Mediterranean Games competitors for Spain